Hellamaa may refer to several places in Estonia:
Hellamaa, Hiiu County, village in Estonia
Hellamaa, Saare County, village in Estonia